Siege of Montevideo may refer to:
 Siege of Montevideo in 1807, during the British invasions of the River Plate
 First Siege of Montevideo in 1811
 Second Siege of Montevideo in 1812-1814
 Siege of Montevideo in 1823, during the Brazilian War of Independence
 Great Siege of Montevideo during the Uruguayan Civil War, 1843-1851